; January 28, 1976 – April 9, 1999) was a Japanese female professional wrestler. She died after a wrestling injury, only months into her professional career.

Kado's wrestling-related ring death was the second to occur in Japan. (The first was fellow joshi wrestler Plum Mariko.)

Career
Kado had her first match in February, 1999 at the ARSION First Anniversary Show at Tokyo's Korakuen Hall in front of 1550 people, losing to Aja Kong. Kado went on to wrestle fourteen more matches in her short career, losing every one. In her last match, on March 31, 1999, she teamed up with Michiko Omukai to face the team of Mariko Yoshida and Mikiko Futagami. About 22 minutes into the match she suffered a serious injury from a blow to the head. Kado was rushed to a hospital in Fukuoka, where she died from intracerebral bleeding on April 9.

See also
 List of premature professional wrestling deaths

References

Further reading
Muchnick, Irvin. Wrestling Babylon: Piledriving Tales of Drugs, Sex, Death, and Scandal. Toronto: ECW Press, 1997.

External links
 by Masanori Horie
Emiko Kado by James Phillips
Picksi's Puroresu News: April 4, 1999
Deceased Superstars - Emiko Kado

1976 births
1999 deaths
Japanese female professional wrestlers
Professional wrestling deaths
Sportspeople from Osaka Prefecture
20th-century professional wrestlers
Sport deaths in Japan